Livin' for Love: The Natalie Cole Story is a 2000 American drama film directed by Robert Townsend and written by Cindy Myers. It is based on the 2000 book Angel on My Shoulder by Natalie Cole and Digby Diehl. The film stars Natalie Cole, Diahann Carroll, James McDaniel, Randy J. Goodwin, Theresa Randle, Michael Anthony Rawlins, Ted Whittall and Richard Sali. The film premiered on NBC on December 10, 2000.

Plot

Cast  
Natalie Cole as Herself
Diahann Carroll as Maria Cole
James McDaniel as Nat King Cole
Randy J. Goodwin as Marvin Yancy
Theresa Randle as Natalie Cole
Michael Anthony Rawlins as Chuck Jackson
Ted Whittall 	
Richard Sali
Clé Bennett as Abdullah
Stephanie Sams as Natalie Cole 
Andrea Lewis as Natalie Cole
Tyson Fennell as Robbie 
A.J. Saudin as Robbie
Kaashif Ford as Robbie 
Alisha Morrison as Cookie Cole
Catherine Burdon as Cookie Cole 
Sandi Ross as Aunt Bay
Raven Dauda as Janice
Quancetia Hamilton as Drue
Megan Fahlenbock as Grace
Judith Goodwin as Sarah
Benz Antoine as Natalie's Bodyguard
Jai Jai Jones as Michael
Leah Miller Cheryl
Sean Wayne Doyle as Jack
Art Hindle as Ralph Goldman
Larry Schwartz as Bob Krasnow
Peter Wright as Bruce Lundvall
Kevin Hare Jerry Griffith
Peter Tufford Kennedy as David Foster 
Michael Kinney as Henry 
Bazil Williams as Preacher 
Barbara Mamabolo as Pam
Angelo Celeste as Tommy LiPuma
Kim Roberts as Preacher's Wife
Laurie Bower as Johnny Mandel

References

External links
 

2000 television films
2000 films
2000 drama films
NBC network original films
Films directed by Robert Townsend
Films scored by Stephen James Taylor
American drama television films
2000s English-language films
2000s American films